Litoria gasconi is a species of frog in the subfamily Pelodryadinae. It is endemic to New Guinea.

The adult male frog measures 39.3 to 41.6 mm in snout-vent length.  It has large eyes with vertical pupils.  It is green in color with yellow spots and parts of its legs and inguinal area are bright orange.

References

gasconi
Frogs of Asia